The deepwater catshark (Apristurus profundorum) is a catshark of the family Scyliorhinidae, found in the western Atlantic from Delaware Bay to Suriname, and in the eastern Atlantic from Morocco to northwest Africa.
An important key factor to understanding these creatures is ageing, many deepwater Apristurus profundorum have poorly calcified vertebrae that lack visible growth bands, and most do not have dorsal fin spines that can be used for ageing. Other methods, such as captive growth and tag-recapture, are also limited in their suitability for deepwater chondrichthyans due to difficulties in the deep sea.

References

3. Rigby, Cassandra L., et al. “The Utility of near Infrared Spectroscopy for Age Estimation of Deepwater Sharks.” Deep-Sea Research Part I: Oceanographic Research Papers, vol. 94, Dec. 2014, pp. 184–194., .

deepwater catshark
Fish of the Atlantic Ocean
deepwater catshark
deepwater catshark
deepwater catshark